Roseate, literally rose-colored, rosy, is used in the names of the following animals:
 Roseate cockatoo
 Roseate frog
 Roseate skimmer
 Roseate spoonbill
 Roseate tern